Another Gay Sequel: Gays Gone Wild! is a 2008 romantic comedy film directed by Todd Stephens. It is the sequel to the 2006 film Another Gay Movie, and features five cast members from the first film: Jonah Blechman (Nico Hunter), Ashlie Atkinson (Dawn Muffler), Scott Thompson (Mr. Wilson), Stephanie McVay (Mrs. Hunter), and Andersen Gabrych. It was released in seven theaters and ran for 10 weeks before its DVD release. It had a negative reception, in contrast to the first film, which developed a small cult following.

Nancy Sinatra, who sang the song "Another Gay Sunshine Day" for the first film, receives "special thanks". Singer RuPaul announced on his website that he and Lady Bunny had recorded a song for the soundtrack that would be released as a single, but the producers of the film ultimately scrapped that song. They used a solo song by Lady Bunny instead. That song was not released as a single, and was replaced by the song "The Clap" by Perez Hilton. The duet of RuPaul and Lady Bunny was later released as a bonus track on RuPaul's album Champion.

Plot
Dorky Andy (Jake Mosser), flamboyant Nico (Jonah Blechman), jock Jarod (Jimmy Clabots), and nerdy Griff (Aaron Michael Davies) reunite in Fort Lauderdale for spring break. The plot revolves around a contest—"Gays Gone Wild!"—to see who can have sex with the most guys during the duration of spring break. The winner will be crowned "Miss Gay Gone Wild".

While Andy seems to have no problem getting men to have sex with him, Nico has not been attracting men at all. He has a frequent fantasy sequence involving a merman (Brent Corrigan). Andy is troubled, however, when he falls hard for Luis (Euriamis Losada), a charming, handsome virgin. Jarod and Griff are also having problems, as they have become a couple, and are conflicted over whether to enter the contest. Meanwhile, a trio by the name of Jasper (Will Wikle, Brand Lim, and Isaac Webster) seem to be eager to win the contest by any means.

In a subplot, the guys meet Perez Hilton on an airplane. Hilton pursues a young priest to the bathroom; he hits his head and becomes a religious zealot trying to suppress the gay activities. He is later hit in the head again and changes back.

Cast

Production
Most filming took place in Fort Lauderdale, with a few final scenes done in Los Angeles. Shooting wrapped in December 2007. The film premiered at the Frameline Film Festival in San Francisco on June 28, 2008.

The film's opening spoofed The Wizard of Oz. The actors portraying Andy (Michael Carbonaro), Jarod (Jonathan Chase), and Griff (Mitch Morris) in the first film were killed, in a partial explanation of the actors' absence from the sequel. Mrs. Hunter (Stephanie McVay) later said that "doing two gay movies in a row will make people think you're actually gay", an allusion as to what the actors' agents may have said.

Critical reception
The film received 20% on the Rotten Tomatoes meter.

References

Further reading
 Padva, Gilad. Boys Want to Have Fun! Carnivalesque Adolescence and Nostalgic Resorts in Another Gay Movie and Another Gay Sequel. In Padva, Gilad, Queer Nostalgia in Cinema and Pop Culture, pp. 98–122 (Palgrave Macmillan, 2014).

External links

Another Gay Sequel: Gays Gone Wild! at Frameline Film Festival

2008 films
2008 independent films
2008 LGBT-related films
2008 romantic comedy films
2000s parody films
2000s sex comedy films
2000s teen comedy films
2000s teen romance films
American independent films
American parody films
American romantic comedy films
American sequel films
American sex comedy films
American teen comedy films
American teen LGBT-related films
American teen romance films
English-language German films
Films about vacationing
Films set in Florida
Films shot in Florida
Gay-related films
German independent films
German LGBT-related films
German romantic comedy films
German sequel films
German sex comedy films
German teen comedy films
Incest in film
LGBT-related romantic comedy films
LGBT-related sex comedy films
2000s American films
2000s German films